Cornus walteri, also called Walter's dogwood, is a deciduous shrub or small tree 8–16 m tall, native to eastern Asia in Korea and much of China from Liaoning to Yunnan.

Cornus walteri has opposite, simple leaves, 5–12 cm long. The flowers are produced in inflorescences 6–8 cm diameter, each flower individually small and whitish. The flowering is in spring, after it leafs out. The fruit is a round, reddish-purple "drupaceous berry", 2.5-3.5 cm diameter.

It is closely related to the European common dogwood (C. sanguinea).

References

External links

 
 

walteri
Flora of Korea
Flora of China
Plants described in 1908